Shola-e Javid was an anti-revisionist Marxist–Leninist communist party founded around 1964 in the Kingdom of Afghanistan. Its strategy was Maoist and populist, gaining support from university students, professionals, the majority Pashtuns and the Shia Hazaras. It grew significantly in popularity throughout the late 1960s and into the 1970s, possibly eclipsing that of the Parcham and Khalq factions of the pro-Soviet People's Democratic Party of Afghanistan (PDPA) up until the factions' reconciliation in 1977. The Shola-e Javid party was made illegal in 1969 after criticizing King Zahir Shah.

See also 
 Akram Yari
 Faiz Ahmad

References 

Communist parties in Afghanistan
Anti-revisionist organizations
Maoist parties
Stalinist parties
Maoist organisations in Afghanistan
Maoism in Afghanistan
Political parties established in 1964
Political parties disestablished in 1969